Archives of Cardiovascular Diseases is a monthly peer-reviewed medical journal covering the study of cardiovascular diseases. It was established in 1908 as Archives des Maladies du Coeur, des Vaisseaux, et du Sang, and changed its name to Archives des Maladies du Coeur et des Vaisseaux in 1937. It obtained its current name in 2008. It is published by Elsevier on behalf of the French Society of Cardiology, of which it is the official journal. The editor-in-chief is Ariel A. Cohen. According to the Journal Citation Reports, the journal has a 2019 impact factor of 2.434.

References

External links

Cardiology journals
Publications established in 1908
Monthly journals
English-language journals
Elsevier academic journals
Academic journals associated with learned and professional societies